The 2003 Tallahassee mayoral special election was held February 4 and February 25, 2003 to elect the mayor of Tallahassee, Florida.

Since no candidate obtained a majority of the vote in the first-round, a runoff was held between the top-two finishers.

The election coincided with elections to City Commissioner Seats 1, 2, 3 and 5.

Marks became the second popularly elected mayor of Tallahassee. Marks became Tallahassee's first elected African American mayor, and its fifth-overall African American mayor.

Background
On January 4, 2003, Tallahassee Mayor Scott Maddox was elected Chairman of the Florida Democratic Party. Maddox announced that he would remain Mayor of Tallahassee until late February 2003, when a special mayor election would be held to elect a successor.

Election results

First round

Runoff

References

2003
2003 Florida elections
2003 United States mayoral elections
United States mayoral special elections
Florida special elections